Bukhan (literally North Han) may refer to:

 The colloquial exonym used to refer to North Korea by South Koreans; see Names of Korea
 Bukhansan or Bukhan Mountain, in Seoul, South Korea
 Bukhan River, in South Korea

See also 
 Namhan (disambiguation)